The Wigwam was a convention center and meeting hall that served as the site of the 1860 Republican National Convention.  It was located in Chicago, Illinois, at Lake Street and Market (later Wacker Drive) near the Chicago River.  This site had previously been the site of the Sauganash Hotel, Chicago's first hotel.  This is where supporters ushered Abraham Lincoln to the party nomination and the eventual U.S. Presidency.  The location at Lake and Wacker was designated a Chicago Landmark on November 6, 2002.  The name "Wigwam", although separate structures, was later associated with host locations for both the 1864 Democratic National Convention and the 1892 Democratic National Convention in Chicago.

The building

The two-story Wigwam was built by Chicago business leaders to attract the 1860 Convention. It was a temporary structure, built entirely of wood in little more than a month, and it could accommodate 10–12,000 people. The building was used for political and patriotic meetings during the Convention and the American Civil War.  It also served as a retail space until its demolition.   The Wigwam was destroyed by fire on November 13, 1869. 
Following the Great Chicago Fire of 1871, another "Wigwam" building at Washington (one city block south of Lake) and Market served as the temporary home of the Chicago Board of Trade.

Antebellum custom was to call a political campaign headquarters a Wigwam.  Wigwam is also a Native American word for "temporary shelter".

History

Sauganash Hotel

Mark Beaubien built a tavern on the site of the later Wigwam in 1829–30.  In 1831, he added a frame to the log structure to create Chicago's first hotel, the Sauganash Hotel, on the east bank of the south branch of the Chicago River at the point where the north and south branches meet. The newly formed Town of Chicago elected its first town trustees in 1833 in the hotel.  The building briefly served as Chicago's first theater, and it hosted the first Chicago Theatre company in 1837 in an abandoned dining room.  The hotel was destroyed by fire in 1851, and the Wigwam was built in its place nine years later.

Conventions
Chicago has hosted the most United States presidential nominating conventions (14 Republican National Conventions and 11 Democratic National Conventions, in addition to one notable Progressive Party assembly).  The 1860 Republican National Convention (the second Republican National Convention) was held at the Wigwam. The 1864 Democratic National Convention was hosted in a different "Wigwam" built for the convention as a semicircular roofed amphitheater.  These were the first Chicago visits for each party's national convention.  Baltimore has hosted 10 and Philadelphia has hosted 9.  The 1868 Republican National Convention returned to Chicago, but it was located at the Crosby Opera House. The 1892 Democratic National Convention convened in a temporary "Wigwam" in Lake Park for Grover Cleveland's third nomination.

1860 Republican National Convention

The 1860 Republican National Convention was eventful for its nomination of Abraham Lincoln, who went on to a Presidency notably marked by the onset of the American Civil War and the abolition of slavery.  During the convention, backroom dealing and political scheming played a role in the outcome. Nevertheless, Lincoln, who had stayed in Springfield during the convention, received vociferous support and carried the nomination.

Today
Today, the corner of W. Lake Street and N. Wacker Drive bears the address of 191 N. Wacker.  This address is in the West Loop neighborhood of the Loop community area in Chicago.  The 157 m (516 ft), 37-story office tower, named 191 North Wacker, was designed by Kohn Pedersen Fox and built in 2002.  The major tenants include Drinker, Biddle & Reath, Much Shelist, Watson Wyatt Worldwide, Heitman Financial, and RSM McGladrey.  In 2017, the city rededicated plaques gifted in the early 20th century by the Daughters of the American Revolution, which commemorate the nomination of Lincoln at the Wigwam, and the Saganaush Hotel.

References

External links

Commercial buildings completed in 1860
Former buildings and structures in Chicago
History of Chicago
Chicago Landmarks
Demolished buildings and structures in Chicago